Woodvale railway station was a railway station located in Woodvale, Merseyside, England.

History
The Southport & Cheshire Lines Extension Railway (SCLER) opened the station on 1 September 1884 as Woodville & Ainsdale, though one source refers to it as "Woodvale and Ainsdale". It was renamed Woodvale on 1 May 1898. The station was built on an embankment crossing Liverpool Road and was well known for its floral displays on both platforms.

Run down and closure
The station first closed in 1917, along with all other stations on the extension line, as a World War I economy measure.

The station was reopened on 1 April 1919, and continued in use until 7 January 1952, when the SCLER was closed to passengers from Aintree Central to Southport Lord Street. The line remained open for public goods traffic until 7 July 1952 at Southport Lord St., Birkdale Palace and Altcar & Hillhouse Stations. Public goods services were ended at Woodvale, Lydiate and Sefton & Maghull stations—there were never any goods facilities at the Ainsdale Beach station—on Saturday, 5 January 1952, which was the same date as passenger services were ended. The official railway closing date is always given  as the Monday following the date of the last trains' run, meaning that the official closing date is 7 January 1952. However, train services almost always end on a Saturday. The final ticket stubs show the date as being 5 January 1952. A private siding remained open at Altcar & Hillhouse after 7 July 1952, finally closing in May 1960. The last passenger train to run on the SCLER was a railway enthusiasts' special between the Aintree and Altcar & Hillhouse railways stations on 6 June 1959.

Present
The track bed was later utilised to support what is now the Coastal Road, which runs from Woodvale to Southport.

References

Sources

External links
The station via Disused Stations UK
The station on an 1888-1913 Overlay OS Map via National Library of Scotland
The station on a 1948 O.S. map via npe Maps
Station and line HTS via railwaycodes
Railtours via sixbellsjunction

Disused railway stations in the Metropolitan Borough of Sefton
Former Cheshire Lines Committee stations
Railway stations in Great Britain opened in 1884
Railway stations in Great Britain closed in 1917
Railway stations in Great Britain opened in 1919
Railway stations in Great Britain closed in 1952